Karyna Kazlouskaya (born 18 July 2000) is a Belarusian archer competing in women's recurve events. In 2019, she represented Belarus at the 2019 European Games in Minsk, Belarus winning the silver medal in the women's team recurve event. She also competed in the women's individual recurve and mixed team recurve events.

At the 2019 Military World Games in Wuhan, China, she won the gold medal in the women's team event.

In 2021, she represented Belarus at the 2020 Summer Olympics in Tokyo, Japan in the team and individual events. Her team (she, Hanna Marusava, and Karyna Dziominskaya) placed fourth. She also competed at the 2021 World Archery Championships held in Yankton, United States.

References

External links 
 

Living people
2000 births
Place of birth missing (living people)
Belarusian female archers
Archers at the 2019 European Games
European Games silver medalists for Belarus
European Games medalists in archery
Olympic archers of Belarus
Archers at the 2020 Summer Olympics
21st-century Belarusian women